The 388th Electronic Combat Squadron is an inactive United States Air Force unit. Its last assignment was with the 366th Fighter Wing, based at Naval Air Station Whidbey Island, Washington.

History
Established in early 1942 as a light bomb squadron, equipped with Douglas A-24 Banshees, although equipped with export model Vultee A-31 Vengeance dive bombers for training.  Trained under Third Air Force in the southeast United States, also used for antisubmarine patrols over the Atlantic southeast coast and then Gulf of Mexico.

Deployed to Southern California in early 1943 to the Desert Warfare Center, trained in light bombing while supporting Army maneuvers in the Mojave Desert until October.

Re-equipped with North American A-36 Apache dive bombers and deployed to New Guinea as part of Fifth Air Force.  In the Southwest Pacific the squadron attacked Japanese strong points and tactical positions and targets of opportunity in support of general Douglas MacArthur's campaign along the north coast of New Guinea; then advancing into the Netherlands East Indies and Philippines as part of the Island Hopping campaign.  It was re-equipped with Curtiss P-40 Warhawkss, and later with Douglas A-20 Havocs.   Engaged in heavy fighting on Leyte, Mindoro and Luzon in the Philippines during 1944–1945.

The squadron moved to Okinawa in mid-August and after the Atomic Bomb missions had been flown; remained on Okinawa until December until returning to the United States with most personnel demobilizing. It was inactivated as a paper unit on 6 January 1946.

The squadron was reactivated as a Boeing B-29 Superfortress unit in the reserves in 1947, but lack of funding and personnel led to rapid inactivation.

Transferred to Tactical Air Command in the mid-1950s and activated first with North American F-86 Sabres, then North American F-100 Super Sabres in 1958.   Inactivated in 1959 when its parent 312th Tactical Fighter Wing was inactivated and replaced by the 27th Tactical Fighter Wing.   Personnel and equipment of the squadron were transferred to the 524th Tactical Fighter Squadron.

Reactivated in 1977 as a General Dynamics F-111A Aardvark training squadron; inactivated 1979.  Reactivated in 1981 as an EF-111A Raven electronic warfare aircraft; inactivated 1982.  Reactivated in 2004 flying Naval Grumman EA-6B Prowler electronic warfare aircraft.  It was inactivated in 2010, being replaced by the 390th Electronic Combat Squadron.

Lineage
 Constituted as the 388th Bombardment Squadron (Light) on 28 January 1942
 Activated on 15 March 1942
 Redesignated 388th Bombardment Squadron (Dive) on 27 July 1942
 Redesignated 388th Bombardment Squadron (Light) on 6 December 1943
 Redesignated 388th Bombardment Squadron, Light c. 28 March 1944
 Redesignated 388th Bombardment Squadron, Heavy on 19 July 1945
 Inactivated on 4 January 1946
 Redesignated 388th Bombardment Squadron, Very Heavy on 14 July 1947
 Activated in the reserve on 30 July 1947
 Inactivated on 27 June 1949
 Redesignated 388th Fighter-Bomber Squadron on 29 July 1954
 Activated on 1 October 1954
 Redesignated 388th Tactical Fighter Squadron on 1 July 1958
 Inactivated on 18 February 1959
 Redesignated 388th Tactical Fighter Training Squadron on 7 February 1977
 Activated on 1 July 1977
 Inactivated on 30 September 1979
 Redesignated 388th Electronic Combat Squadron on 29 January 1981
 Activated on 1 July 1981
 Inactivated on 15 December 1982
 Activated on 15 December 2004
 Inactivated on 27 September 2010

Assignments
 312th Bombardment Group, 15 March 1942 – 4 January 1946
 Tenth Air Force, 30 July 1947
 312th Bombardment Group, 13 August 1947 – 27 June 1949
 312th Fighter-Bomber Group, 1 October 1954
 312th Fighter-Bomber Wing (later 312th Tactical Fighter Wing), 8 October 1957 – 18 February 1959 (attached to Air Task Force 13 (Provisional), 4 September–3 December 1958)
 366th Tactical Fighter Wing, 1 July 1977 – 30 September 1979
 366th Tactical Fighter Wing, 1 July 1981 – 15 December 1982
 366th Operations Group, 15 December 2004 – 27 September 2010

Stations

 Bowman Field, Kentucky, 15 March 1942
 Will Rogers Airport, Oklahoma, 12 June 1942
 Hunter Field, Georgia, 18 August 1942
 DeRidder Army Air Base, Louisiana, 18 February 1943
 Rice Army Airfield, California, 13 April 1943
 Salinas Army Air Base, California, 13 August – 24 October 1943
 Jackson Airfield (7 Mile Drome), Port Moresby, New Guinea, 30 November 1943
 Gusap Airfield, New Guinea,3 January 1944
 Nadzab Airfield Complex, New Guinea, 11 June 1944
 Hollandia Airfield Complex, Netherlands East Indies, 4 July 1944
 Tanauan Airfield, Leyte, Philippines Commonwealth, 19 November 1944
 McGuire Field, San Jose, Occidental Mindoro, Philippines, 27 January 1945

 Mangaldan Airfield, Luzon, Philippines, c. 11 February 1945
 Floridablanca Airfield, Luzon, Philippines, 20 April 1945
 Yontan Airfield, Okinawa, c. 12 August – 13 December 1945
 Fort Lawton, Washington, 1–4 January 1946
 Ellington Field (later Ellington Air Force Base), Texas, 30 July 1947 – 27 June 1949
 Clovis Air Force Base (later Cannon Air Force Base), New Mexico, 1 October 1954 – 18 February 1959
 Deployed at Chia Yi AB, Formosa, 4 September-3 December 1958
 Mountain Home Air Force Base, Idaho, 1 July 1977 – 30 September 1979; 1 July 1981 – 15 December 1982
 Whidbey Island Naval Air Station, Washington, 15 December 2004 – 27 September 2010

Aircraft
 Vultee A-31 Vengeance, 1942–1943
 Douglas A-24 Banshee, 1942–1943
 North American A-36 Apache, 1943
 Curtiss P-40 Warhawk, 1943–1944
 Douglas A-20 Havoc, 1944–1945
 North American F-86 Sabre, 1955–1956
 North American F-100 Super Sabre, 1956–1959.
 General Dynamics F-111A Aardvark, 1977–1979.
 General Dynamics EF-111A Raven, 1981–1982.
 Grumman EA-6B Prowler, 2004–2010

References

Notes

Bibliography

  (subscription required for web access)
 
 
 

Electronic warfare squadrons of the United States Air Force